The SMOSH West Lakes Football Club is an Australian rules football club based in the western suburbs of Adelaide which was formed in 1996 as a merger between the former St. Michael's Old Scholars and Hindmarsh Football Club and West Lakes Football Club.  The club has participated in the South Australian Amateur Football League since being formed.

A-Grade Premierships 
 South Australian Amateur Football League Division 3 (1)
 2007 
 South Australian Amateur Football League Division 4 (1)
 2003

Merger history 
SMOSH West Lakes was formed in 1996 through the amalgamation of St. Michael's Old Scholars and Hindmarsh Football Club and West Lakes Football Club.

St. Michael’s Old Scholars and Hindmarsh (SMOSH) 
The St. Michael's Old Scholars and Hindmarsh Football Club was first formed as church team St. Saviour, representing St. Saviour's Catholic Church at Brompton, which was open from 1868 to 1924.  Some records indicate matches were played against other church teams in the 1890s but it is not known if these were part of an organised competition.  The first record of participating in an organised competition was when they finished runners-up to St. Francis Xavier's in the St. Vincent de Paul Football Association in 1907.  St. Saviour's was renamed Hindmarsh CYM (Catholic Young Men) for four years from 1939 before a slight change of name to Hindmarsh CYMS (Catholic Young Men's Society) in 1943.  In 1975, the club formed a partnership with St Michael's College and once again changed names to become St. Michael's Old Scholars and Hindmarsh.

A-Grade Premierships

 Catholic Young Men's Society Football Association (5)
 1944 
 1945 
 1946 Undefeated 
 1947 Undefeated 
 1948
 1950 
 Adelaide Metropolitan Football League A Division (1)
 1967 
 South Australian Amateur Football League A3 (1)
 1994

West Lakes 

The West Lakes Football Club was first formed as the Semaphore Park Football Club in 1930.  In 1978 they joined the South Australian Football Association and in 1984 were renamed West Lakes Football Club.

A-Grade Premierships
 Port Adelaide and District Football Association (2)
 1949 
 1950 
 South Australian Amateur Football League A3 (1)
 1951 Undefeated 
 1955 
 South Australian Amateur Football League A4 (1)
 1967

References 

Australian rules football clubs in South Australia
Australian rules football clubs established in 1996
1996 establishments in Australia
Adelaide Footy League clubs